The gummy shark (Mustelus antarcticus), also known as the Australian smooth hound, flake, sweet william or smooth dog-shark, is a shark in the family Triakidae. These small to medium-sized bottom-dwelling sharks are found mostly in, but are not limited to, the area around the southern seas of Australia and is commonly baited and fished for cuisine because of its taste and market prices. According to a 2021 paper by White, Arunrugstichai & Naylorn (2021), Mustelus walkeri (eastern spotted gummy shark) is the same animal as M. antarcticus. One theory is that M. walkeri is a subpopulation of M. antarcticus.

Appearance
This species is a slender shark with a darker grey top with white spots and a silvery-white underbelly. The gummy shark gets its name from its flat, plate-like teeth which it uses to crush its shelled and non-shelled prey. At birth, these sharks measure between 30 and 35 cm. Said measurements are taken from the rear-most gill slit to the base of the tail fin.

Hunting and habitat
The gummy shark feeds on crustaceans, marine worms, small fish, and cephalopods such as octopus, squid and cuttlefish. It uses its plate-like teeth to help it crush the shells and bodies of its prey for easier consumption. The gummy shark remains on or near the sea beds, and their travel patterns vary on age. Juvenile gummy sharks will travel less than full-grown species. The females tend to travel longer ranges compared to males. Gummy sharks are primarily found to live in sandy areas and will come closer to shores during the night in search of prey.

Geography 
The gummy shark is primarily found living on the southern coast of Australia around Bunbury including but not limited to the island of Tasmania and Bass Straight.  Gummy sharks are also found in coastal areas of the Pacific Ocean such as Japan, as well as coastal areas of the Indian Ocean.

Reproductive tendencies
The reproduction of the single-sex school gummy sharks is ovoviviparous. Ovoviviparous organisms are those who produce young via egg which are then hatched inside of the parents' bodies. A common example of an ovoviviparous animal is a seahorse. Gummy sharks have an ovulation and mating period that lasts about three months from November–February. The gestation period in this species is between eleven to twelve months. The embryos can get to be thirty to thirty-six centimeters total in length. Pregnant gummy sharks will rely on inshore nursery areas such as a bay or sheltered space close to shore to have her pups. Females can have up to 57 pups per litter and are ready to do so by the age of five. The average number of pups per litter birthed by the female Mustelus antarcticus is 14 but can have up to 57. The sex ratio in the embryos is 1:1. Male sharks are ready to reproduce by the age of four. The typical generation length for the gummy shark is 10 years and have an average life expectancy of 16 years.

Predators and human interaction
Mustelus antarcticus pose no known threat to beachgoers or fisherman. Because of gummy sharks' bottom-dwelling habitat, they have minimal contact with humans, and they tend to flee when spotted, hence why observational studies of this species is difficult. Gummy sharks have only two known predators. One is humans, who catch them for consumption and sport fishing. The other main predator is the broadnose sevengill shark, which preys on juveniles that remain close to shallow waters.

Fishing and consumption
Gummy sharks are of the more highly targeted fish for human consumption. Gummy shark meat is often marketed as "flake" in southern Australia. Their boneless fillets have made them particularly popular within the fish and chips industry throughout Australia.[1] Although gummy sharks have not been over-fished, they inhabit many of the same areas as school (snapper) sharks which have an established bycatch quota. This means fishers targeting gummy shark cannot have an adverse impact on the school shark population.[2]  Due to new fishing gear, the growth rate of gummy sharks between three to seven years of age have decreased. However, gummy sharks around the age of two are least affected by fisheries. This species is also of least concern in terms of endangerment according to the IUCN Red List, which is an extensive list of species that organizes where they fall on the endangered scale from "least concern" (LC) to "extinct" (EX). According to SharkSmart, roughly one hundred gummy sharks are tagged with internal acoustic tags in Western Australia to yield information about possible migration and travel habits.

Bag limits for recreational fishers in Victoria apply. Bag limits are laws placed on fisherman and hunters to limit the number of specific species they are allowed to catch, kill and/or keep. Fishermen have both a bag and a possession limit of two shark and/or school shark, landed whole or as a carcass. There is a five-shark limit for large boats. If caught these sharks must be released if it is in total no larger than 75 cm or roughly two and a half feet.

See also

 List of marine animals of Australia (temperate waters)

References

  Database entry includes justification for why this species is of least concern
 
 
 Edgar, Graham J. Australian Marine Life: The Plants and Animals of Temperate Waters. Reed New Holland, 2003.

External links
 Fishes of Australia: Mustelus antarcticus

Mustelus
Marine fish of Southern Australia
Gummy shark
Gummy shark